Watatatow was a Canadian French-language children/youth television series, that aired from 1991 to 2005 on Radio-Canada. The first show aired on September 17, 1991. 104 half-hour episodes were filmed every year; they were shown four afternoons a week on Radio-Canada. Watatatow helped launch the careers of several young actors, including Hugo St-Cyr, Michel Goyette, Élise Aussant, Serge Postigo, Robert Brouillette, Suzanne Clément, Isabelle Guérard, Fabien Cloutier, Cas Anvar and Annie Cotton.

The name "Watatatow" was invented by the show's producers; its meaning is simply an expression of joy.

Actors on the show were of varying ages, sizes, physical abilities, looks and ethnicities, and generally were presented as real people with real problems. Characters on the show dealt with a wide variety of social and personal issues, including sexual harassment, pregnancy, clinical depression, substance abuse, anorexia and cults.

The first Watatatow DVD, which contained forty 'highlight' episodes from the first season, was released in November 2005. The DVD box set of highlights from the second season was released on October 31, 2006.

External links

Television shows filmed in Quebec
1991 Canadian television series debuts
2005 Canadian television series endings
Ici Radio-Canada Télé original programming
1990s Canadian teen drama television series
2000s Canadian teen drama television series
Television series about teenagers